Parophthalmoptera picea is a species of ulidiid or picture-winged fly in the genus Parophthalmoptera of the family Ulidiidae.

References

Ulidiidae